Latia neritoides is a species of small freshwater snail or limpet, an aquatic gastropod mollusc in the family Latiidae.

The type specimen is in the British Museum.

The specific epithet "neritoides" means "like a nerite". The shell of this species has an internal shelf or lamella, but it more closely resembles a shell of a Crepidula than it does a Nerita.

Distribution
This species is endemic to the North Island of New Zealand.

Habitat
This limpet lives in clean running streams and rivers.

Shell description

The length of the shell is up to 11 mm. The width of the shell is up to 8 mm. The height of the shell is up to 4.5 mm.

If the length of the shell is 8.5 mm, the width of the shell is 6 mm. The height of the shell is 3 mm.

The shell is semiovate, thin and fragile, almost smooth, brown, semitransparent. Sculpture consisting of microscopic rather distant radiate striae, and fine dense concentric growth-lines. Colour pale to dark brown; interior dark brown in the centre, the lamina white. Apex posterior, extending a little beyond the margin, with a spiral nucleus of 1 whorl, visible on the right side. The apex is generally on the left side, but sometimes near the middle of the posterior margin.

The aperture is large, oval, the thin sharp margin generally rounded, but the posterior part of it is occasionally straightened and forming more or 
less distinct angles with the lateral sides, which themselves may become almost straight. The inside is polished. The lamella has the left attached end near the middle of the left margin, but the right free end does not extend beyond the posterior third of the length of the shell.

Anatomy 
The animal has ringed filiform tentacles. The eyes are situated at the outer bases of the tentacles.

The formula of the radula is 30 x 27 + 1 + 27. The central tooth is small and bicuspid. The lateral teeth increasing in size up to the 16th, and then diminish again, they have first 1, then 2, and near the margin 3 cusps. Further details on its morphology and internal anatomy are given in Meyer-Rochow & Moore

Bioluminescence

These animals are bioluminescent and highly phosphorescent. This can easily be seen in the dark by disturbing the animals, or by adding a few drops of alcohol to the water. This is the only known freshwater gastropod that emits light. The light stems from a luminescent slime that is emitted by the snail when it gets disturbed or is attacked by a predator such as a crayfish, an eel, or even a dragonfly nymph. Further details on its ecology and general biology can be found in.  
Latia luciferin is chemically (E)-2-methyl-4-(2,6,6-trimethyl-1-cyclohex-1-yl)-1-buten-1-ol formate.

The chemical reaction is like this:

XH2 is a reducing agent. The reaction is catalyzed by the enzyme luciferase and a purple protein.

See also 
 Quantula striata, the only known terrestrial gastropod that emits light.

References
This article incorporates public domain text from the reference

Further reading 
 Hubendick B. (1979) "Figures of Latia neritoides". Journal of Molluscan Studies 45: 353-354. abstract

External links 

 New Zealand Mollusca
 External and internal view of a shell
 Views of eggs, animals, and shells

Latiidae
Bioluminescent molluscs
Gastropods described in 1850
Taxa named by John Edward Gray
Freshwater molluscs of Oceania